General Lansana Conté Stadium is a new multi-use stadium in Conakry, Guinea.  It was completed in 2011, it is used mostly for football and athletics competitions and it hosts some home matches for the Guinea national football team.

References

External links 

Stadium information 
Stadium information 
Stadium Pictures
Stadium Picture 

Football venues in Guinea
Athletics (track and field) venues in Guinea
Sports venues completed in 2011